Tall Man Riding is a 1955 American Western Warnercolor film directed by Lesley Selander and starring Randolph Scott, Dorothy Malone, and Peggie Castle. Based on the novel Tall Man Riding, by Norman A. Fox, the film is about a cowboy (Scott) seeking revenge against a ranch owner for publicly whipping him years earlier and for breaking up his relationship with the ranch owner's daughter (Malone).

Plot
Seven years after being expelled from the city by cattle baron Tucker Ordway, Larry Madden returns to take revenge and claim his rightful land. He also plans to resume romance with beautiful Corinna, Tucker's daughter. Incredulous Corinna finally allies with Larry, who is still undecided whether to kill Ordway, as doing so would separate him from society for the rest of his life.

Cast
 Randolph Scott as Larry Madden
 Dorothy Malone as Corinna Ordway
 Peggie Castle as Reva, Pearlo's Palace entertainer
 Bill Ching as Rex Willard
 John Baragrey as Sebo Pearlo
 Robert Barrat as Tucker Ordway
 John Dehner as Ames Luddington
 Paul Richards as The Peso Kid
 Lane Chandler as Hap Sutton
 Mickey Simpson as Deputy Jeff Barclay
 Joe Bassett as Will
 Charles Watts as Al, Pearlo's Palace bartender
 Russell Conway as Marshal Jim Feathergill
 Holly Bane as Tom
 Philo McCullough as Townsman (uncredited)
 Jack Mower as Townsman (uncredited)

Production

Filming locations
 Dijon Street, Warner Brothers Burbank Studios, 4000 Warner Boulevard, Burbank, California, USA
 French Ranch, Hidden Valley Road, Thousand Oaks, California, USA 
 Iverson Ranch, 1 Iverson Lane, Chatsworth, Los Angeles, California, USA 
 Janss Conejo Ranch, Thousand Oaks, California, USA 
 Universal Studios, 100 Universal City Plaza, Universal City, California, USA (Six Points western town)

Soundtrack
 "Oh, He Looked Like He Might Buy Wine" (Ray Heindorf and Sammy Cahn)
 "It Looks Like a Big Night Tonight" (Egbert Van Alstyne and Harry Williams)
 "As the Brass Band Played" (Ray Heindorf and Jack Scholl)

See also
 List of American films of 1955

References

External links
 
 
 
 

1955 films
1955 Western (genre) films
American Western (genre) films
1950s English-language films
Films based on American novels
Films based on Western (genre) novels
Films set in the 1890s
Films set in Montana
Warner Bros. films
Films directed by Lesley Selander
Films scored by Paul Sawtell
1950s American films